In the deuterocanonical Book of Judith, Holofernes was an invading Assyrian general known for having been beheaded by Judith, a Hebrew widow who entered his camp and beheaded him while he was drunk.

Holofernes had been dispatched by Nebuchadnezzar to take vengeance on Israel, which had withheld assistance in his most recent war. Having occupied every country along the coastline, Holofernes destroyed all worship of gods other than Nebuchadnezzar. Holofernes was warned against attacking the Jewish people by Achior, the leader of the Ammonites; however, despite the advice he laid siege to the city of Bethulia, commonly believed to be Meselieh. The city almost fell to the invading army; Holofernes' advance stopped the water supply to Bethulia, leading to its people encouraging their rulers to give in to Holofernes' demands. The leaders vowed to surrender if no help arrived within five days. Bethulia was saved by Judith, a Hebrew widow, who entered the camp of Holofernes, seduced him, and got him drunk before beheading him. Judith returned to Bethulia with the severed head of Holofernes, having defeated the army.

Hebrew versions of the tale in the Megillat Antiochus and the Chronicles of Jerahmeel identify "Holofernes" as Nicanor; the Greek version used "Holofernes" as deliberately cryptic substitute, similarly using "Nebuchadnezzar" for Antiochus. 

Holofernes is depicted in  Geoffrey Chaucer's The Monk's Tale in The Canterbury Tales, and in Dante's Purgatorio (where Holofernes is to be found on the Terrace of Pride as an example of "pride cast down", XII.58–60). As a painter's subject he offers the chance to contrast the flesh and jewels of a beautiful, festively attired woman with the grisly head of the victim, a deuterocanonical parallel to the Yael sequence in the Hebrew Bible, as well as the New Testament vignette of Salome with the head of John the Baptist.

See also
Sisera

References

External links 

Book of Judith
Deaths by decapitation
Male murder victims
People in the deuterocanonical books